Eli Urbanová (8 February 1922 – 20 January 2012) was a Czech poet, novelist, and Esperantist. She is best known for her autobiographical novel Hetajro dancas.

Biography 
Urbanová published her first story in the Czech language in 1935 when she was 13 years old, and her first book of poems, was published in 1940 under a pseudonym. In 1942, she married Štěpán Urban. She learned Esperanto in 1948 and wrote her first Esperanto poem in 1950. Urbanová worked as a music teacher in Czechoslovakia, teaching piano, violin, and violoncello. In 1956, she was a co-founder of the Internacia Verkista Asocio. She published her first book of Esperanto poems in 1960.

Literary style 
Urbanová is considered to be one of the most important Esperantist writers. Her work has been described as focusing on "the thoughts and feelings of the female soul" and making "even the most ordinary objects become symbols in her poems". William Auld described her as a successor to Julio Baghy.

Notable works 
  (Mirror, 1940)
  (With Only Three Colors, 1960)
  (From Springs Beneath, 1981)
  (Verse and Teardrop, 1986)
  (A Hetaera Dances, 1995)
  (Wine, Men and Song, 1995)
  (Heavy Wine, 1996)
  (From My Boudoir, 2001)
  (Time Has Passed Swiftly, 2003)
  (2007)

See also 

 Czech literature
 Esperanto literature

References

Bibliography 
 

1922 births
2012 deaths
People from Čáslav
20th-century Czech novelists
20th-century Czech poets
20th-century Czech women writers
21st-century Czech novelists
21st-century Czech poets
21st-century Czech women writers
Czech Esperantists
Czech women novelists
Czech women poets